The Ambassador of Ukraine to Canada is the ambassador extraordinary and plenipotentiary from Ukraine to Canada.

History

Canada became the first Western power to recognize the independence of Ukraine on 2 December 1991. Diplomatic relations were fully established on January 27, 1992, when the Minister of Foreign Affairs Anatoliy Zlenko and the Secretary of State for External Affairs Barbara McDougal exchanged notes.

On September 10, 1992, a Canadian of Ukrainian descent, Erast Hutsulyak, obtained a house at 331 Metcalfe Street in Ottawa for $615,000; he donated it to the Government of Ukraine as accommodation for the Embassy of Ukraine in Canada. The embassy was officially opened on December 1, 1992. In 1994, another house was purchased for the embassy, at 310 Somerset Street West, for $1.8 million. Most of the funds came from the Ukrainian Canadian Congress. The building at Metcalfe Street was left for the Consulate of Ukraine in Ottawa.

Ambassadors to Canada
 1991–1992 Aleksei Rodionov (Chargé d'Affaires of Ukraine in Canada)
 1992-05-14 – 1993-10-15 Levko Lukyanenko
 1994 – 1996-01-17 Victor Batiuk
 1996-01-24 – 1998-10-15 Volodymyr Furkalo
 1998-10-22 – 1999-12-11 Volodymyr Khandohiy
 2000-03-09 – 2003-04-07 Yuriy Shcherbak
 2004-03-20 – 2006-02-07 Mykola Maimeskul
 2006-09-11 – 2011-06-16 Ihor Ostash
 2011 - 2012 Marko Shevchenko (Chargé d'Affaires of Ukraine in Canada)
 2012-11-08 – 2014-11 Vadym Prystaiko
 2014-11-27 – 2015 Marko Shevchenko (Chargé d'Affaires of Ukraine in Canada)
 2015-09-24 – 2021-08-25 Andriy Shevchenko
 2022-03-9 Yulia Kovaliv

See also
 Canada–Ukraine relations

External links
 Webpage of the Embassy of Ukraine in Canada

 
Canada
Ukraine